Konstantinos "Kostas" Kotzias (17 May 1892 – 8 December 1951) was a Greek fencer. He competed at the 1912 and 1924 Summer Olympics.

In 1934 he was elected Mayor of Athens. In the dictatorial Metaxas Regime, he served as Minister for the Capital District. 

Following the suicide of Prime Minister Alexandros Koryzis on 18 January 1941, amidst the German invasion of Greece, King George II of Greece considered him to head a new cabinet, but his candidacy was unsuccessful, as he was closely associated with the Metaxas Regime and few politicians were willing to work under him; the British ambassador to Greece, Michael Palairet, also opposed his nomination in talks with the King, due to Kotzias' Germanophile reputation.

During the Axis Occupation of Greece, he lived in the United States. He was elected an MP for Athens in 1950 and was re-elected as the city's mayor in 1951, shortly before his death. Kotzia Square in Athens is named after him.

One of his sons was George Cotzias, a well known physician that pioneered the L-dopa treatment for Parkinson's disease.

References

Sources

External links
 

1892 births
1951 deaths
Sportspeople from Athens
Politically Independent Alignment politicians
Government ministers of Greece
Greek MPs 1950–1951
4th of August Regime
Mayors of Athens
Greek male fencers
Olympic fencers of Greece
Fencers at the 1912 Summer Olympics
Fencers at the 1924 Summer Olympics
Panathinaikos F.C. presidents
Greek sportsperson-politicians
Politicians from Athens